Duniya is a 1968 Indian Hindi-language romantic thriller film written by K. A. Narayan and directed by T. Prakash Rao. The film starred Dev Anand, Vyjayanthimala in the lead with Balraj Sahni, Johnny Walker, Lalita Pawar, Prem Chopra, Sulochana Latkar, Madan Puri, Nana Palsikar, Achala Sachdev, Laxmi Chhaya, Jagdish Raj, Tun Tun, Brahm Bhardwaj and Pakistani actor Suresh as the ensemble cast. The film was produced by Amarjeet. The film's score was composed by Shankar Jaikishan duo with lyrics provided by Hasrat Jaipuri, S. H. Bihari and Gopaldas Neeraj, edited by Shivaji Awdhut and was filmed by Faredoon A. Irani. The story revolves around three friends (Amarnath, Gopal, and his sister, Mala), how they face their problems in life, and how they recover from the problems in the rest of the story.

Plot
The movie deals about three friend Amarnath, Gopal and his sister, Mala. As Mala and Gopal's mother is a widow and is unable to care for both the children, she decides to let her Bombay-based cousin, Shobha R. Sharma, adopt Mala. Gopal is always in trouble with the villagers for petty theft, and when he learns that Mala has left, he too runs away from home. Years later, all three have grown up. Mala's mother is deceased, while she continues to live with her aunt and uncle, Public Prosecutor Ramnath Sharma; Amarnath is now an Advocate working with Senior Advocate Mehta, and is in love with Mala, not knowing that she is his childhood friend; while Gopal has been to prison in Poona, Madras, and the Police in Hyderabad want him for questioning. Soon Amarnath will be defending Gopal, alias Ram Singh, for the murder of one Mohanchand – and it will be an uphill task for Amarnath – for not only do the Police have airtight evidence against Gopal, Mohanchand was to be the future son-in-law of Ramnath – who has sworn to bring Gopal to justice by hook or by crook.

Cast
 Dev Anand as Advocate Amarnath Sharma "Amar"
 Vyjayanthimala as Mala
 Balraj Sahni as Public Prosecutor Ramnath Sharma
 Prem Chopra as Mohanchand "Mohan"
 Madan Puri as Madan
 Johnny Walker as James Bond
 Lalita Pawar as Mrs. Sharma
 Sulochana Latkar as Janki Sharma
 Achala Sachdev as Shobha Sharma
 Laxmi Chhaya as Laxmi
 Nana Palsikar as Girdharilal
 Jagdish Raj as Madan's Associate
 Brahm Bhardwaj as Advocate Mehta
 Suresh as Gopal / Ram Singh
 Tun Tun as Chhabili

Soundtrack
The film's soundtrack was composed by the Shankar Jaikishan duo, while the lyrics were provided by Hasrat Jaipuri, S. H. Bihari and Gopaldas Neeraj.

† Lyrics on actress Laxmi Chhaya

Box office

Award
Filmfare Awards
Best Cinematographer – Faredoon A. Irani

References

External links
 
 Duniya profile at Upperstall.com
 Duniya profile & review at Molodezhnaja (German)

1960s Hindi-language films
1968 films
1960s comedy thriller films
1960s romantic thriller films
Indian comedy thriller films
Indian romantic comedy films
Indian romantic thriller films
1968 romantic comedy films
Films scored by Shankar–Jaikishan
Films directed by T. Prakash Rao